Strong Girl Bong-soon is a 2017 South Korean television series starring Park Bo-young in the title role as a woman with superhuman strength, with Park Hyung-sik and Ji Soo. It aired on JTBC from February 24 to April 15, 2017.

The series was a commercial hit and became one of the highest-rated Korean dramas on cable television history.

Synopsis
Do Bong-soon (Park Bo-young) was born with superhuman strength. Her strength is hereditary and passed along only to the women in her family. Her dream is to create a video game with herself as the main character. She desperately wants to become a delicate and elegant woman, which is the ideal type of her crush, In Guk-doo (Ji Soo), a police officer. Thanks to her strength, she gets a job as bodyguard to rich heir Ahn Min-hyuk (Park Hyung-sik), the CEO of a gaming company, Ainsoft. 
A series of kidnapping cases happen in Dobong-dong, the district Bong-soon lives in, and she is determined to catch the culprit, who targeted her best friend. With help and training from Min-hyuk, she manages to control her strength to use it for good causes. Min-hyuk and Bong-soon find their relationship growing into something more. Their relationship at work and in pursuit of the kidnapper creates comical and dangerous situations, which bring them closer.

Cast

Main
 Park Bo-young as Do Bong-soon
 Shin Bi as young Do Bong-soon
A young woman born with superhuman strength who tries not to use her powers but does not hesitate to use them for good when needed. She has had a crush on Guk-doo for a long time but eventually falls for Min-hyuk. She will lose her powers if she harms an innocent with them.
 Park Hyung-sik as Ahn Min-hyuk
 Choi Seung-hoon as young Ahn Min-hyuk
A chaebol heir and CEO of a gaming company who hides his pain underneath his cheeky demeanour. He knows Bong-soon even before the "Bus incident" but is not aware of it until much later.
 Ji Soo as In Guk-doo
 Choi Min-young as young In Guk-doo
 An idealistic rookie detective who is passionate about justice. Known for being crazy and extremely aggressive he is continuously transferred from one department to another. He was initially unaware of Bong-soon's powers.

Supporting

People around Do Bong-soon

 Ahn Woo-yeon as Do Bong-ki
 Lee Hyo-dan as young Do Bong-ki
Bong-soon's twin brother. He cares for Bong-soon.
 Shim Hye-jin as Hwang Jin-yi
Bong-soon's mother. She corners Bong-soon and always prioritised Bong-ki. She often assaults her husband.
 Yoo Jae-myung as Do Chil-goo
Bong-soon's father. He is naive and cares deeply for both his children. Despite being beaten by his wife frequently, he tries to maintain a positive attitude.
 Park Bo-mi as Na Kyung-shim
Bong-soon's friend from Busan. She was Kim Jang-hyun's fourth kidnapping victim. She knows about Bong-soon's powers.
 Baek Soo-ryun as Lady Soon-shim
Bong-soon's maternal grandmother.
 Kim Mi-hee as Myung-soo's mother
 Kim Soo-yeon as Jae-soon's mother

People around Ahn Min-hyuk

 Jeon Seok-ho as Secretary Gong
Min-hyuk's secretary.
 Han Jung-kook as Ahn Chul-do
Min-hyuk's father, Chairman of Ohsung Group.
 Kim Sung-bum as Ahn Dong-ha
Min-hyuk's half-brother.
 Shim Hoon-gi as Ahn Dong-suk
Min-hyuk's formerly trusted half-brother.
 Lee Se-wook as Ahn Kyung-hwan
Min-hyuk's half-brother.

People around In Guk-doo

 Seol In-ah as Jo Hee-ji
Guk-doo's girlfriend. 
 Yoon Ye-hee as Jung Mi-hwa
Guk-doo's mother.

People at Baek Tak Party

 Im Won-hee as Baek Soo-tak
 Kim Min-kyo as Ahgari
 Kim Won-hae as Kim Kwang-bok
 Kim Ki-moo as Hwang Hyun-dong
 Lee Ho-cheol

Do Bong Police Station Criminal Team 3

 Choi Moo-in as Team Leader Yook
 Oh Soon-tae as Bulgom (Brown Bear)
 Joo Ho as Neokboi (Knock Boy)
 Choi Hyung as Heollaengyi (Hell Angel)
 Kim Won-suk as Dotbogi (Magnifying Glass)

Ainsoft Employee
 Kim Won-hae as Oh Dol-ppyeo
Head of Development Planning Team; doppelgänger of Kim Kwang-bok.

Extended

 Jang Mi-kwan as Kim Jang-hyun
A criminal. He was the true perpetrator of the serial kidnapping of young girls, and throughout the series, especially the latter part, he was in an enmity with Bong-soon and tried ways to get rid of her. Eventually, Kim Jang-hyun was arrested and sentenced to life imprisonment for murder and kidnapping.
 Son Hyo-eun as Jung Hyang-sook
A murder victim. She was in fact, Kim Jang-hyun's first intended kidnapping victim but was murdered by him due to her fierce attempts to self-defence.
 Choi Hyun-seo as Kim Ji-won
High-school teacher; the first kidnapped victim.
 Choi Young-shin as Lee Joo-young
Dance instructor; the second kidnapped victim.
 Min Ji-hyun as Pharmacist
The third kidnapped victim.
 Kim Hyun-mok as Bullied student	
 Kim Young-choon as Il Jin
A high school student and the leader of Bong-soon's lackeys.
 Yoo In-soo as Kang Goo
One of Bong-soon's lackeys.
 Choi Won-myeong as Jang Kyung-tae	
 Hong Ye-ri as Ho Soon-yi
Do Bong Walnut shop employee.
 Kim Tae-soo as Oh Hyun-joong
The contract killer.
 Lee Ho-chul as Team Leader Jo
Oh Hyun-joong's associate.
 Hapkie as Member of Baek Tak Party
 Kim Won-jun as Subway Molester
 Lee Jung-kwi as High school boy bullied by Il Jin's gang
 Jun Byung-chul as Lee Woo-jin

Special appearances

 Kang Ji-young as JTVC announcer (Ep. 2, 8, 10 & 13)
  as Fortuneteller (Ep. 4 & 7)
 
 Song Won-geun as Song Won-geun, Theatre actor (Ep. 7 & 8)
 Yoon Sang-hyun as Charles Go (Ep. 8)
  as Voice Phishing specialist
  as Voice Phishing specialist
 Jang Sung-kyu as JTVC announcer
 Kwon Hyuk-soo as fake Indian Monk Nizamuddin / Jo Dal-bong (Ep. 12–14)
 Lee Sang as the Ainsoft Receptionist (Ep. 14)
 Clara Lee as Lee Bong-soon, Dental Hygienist (Ep. 16)

Production
The drama is written by Baek Mi-kyung who previously wrote Beloved Eun-dong and directed by Lee Hyung-min of Ms. Temper and Nam Jung-gi. Filming started in October 2016 and finished on April 11, 2017.

The drama serves as a reunion between Park Hyung-sik and Yoo Jae-myung who previously worked together in the KBS2 drama Hwarang: The Poet Warrior Youth. As well as Kim Won-Hae.

Original soundtrack

Charted songs

Ratings
 In this table,  represent the lowest ratings and  represent the highest ratings.
 N/A denotes that the rating is not known.

Awards and nominations

Adaptation and sequel

Aborted American adaptation
On November 9, 2018, it was announced that an adaptation of the series was in development at The CW from CBS Television Studios and writer Melissa Scrivner-Love, with Ronda Rousey and Ben Silverman also set to executive produce. The project, titled Strong Girl, would have followed "a former war photographer named Rayna who discovers she is indestructible and potentially the strongest woman in the world. Ghosted by [her Special Operations fiancé] when she reveals her newfound power to him, Rayna is hired as a bodyguard by a billionaire named Oliver, who sees her true potential." On February 8, 2019, it was revealed that the script was not picked up to pilot.

Sequel
A sequel of the series titled Strong Woman Gang Nam-soon, starring Kim Jung-eun, Kim Hae-sook, Lee Yoo-mi, Ong Seong-wu and Byeon Woo-seok, is set to air in the first half of 2023.

References

External links
  
 
 

JTBC television dramas
Korean-language television shows
South Korean romantic comedy television series
South Korean crime television series
2017 South Korean television series debuts
2017 South Korean television series endings
Kidnapping in television
Fictional characters with superhuman strength
Television series by JS Pictures
Television series by Drama House